The FIBA World Olympic Qualifying Tournament for Men 2008 was the final qualifying tournament for the 2008 Olympic men's basketball tournament. Organized by FIBA, it took place from 14 to 20 July 2008 at the OAKA Indoor Sports Arena, in Athens, Greece.
The draw for the tournament was held on 31 January 2008 at the Divani Caravel hotel in Athens.

Through this tournament, the final three qualifying berths for the 2008 Olympics men's basketball competition were determined. A total of 12 teams competed in the 2008 FIBA World Olympic Qualifying Tournament from the five FIBA regions, and those 12 teams were based on finishes in each of FIBA's five zone qualifying tournaments. The FIBA Africa Zone placed two teams (runner-up and third place), the FIBA Americas Zone placed three teams (third place, fourth place and fifth place), the FIBA Asia Zone placed two teams (runner-up and third place), the FIBA Europe Zone placed four teams (fourth place, fifth place, sixth place and seventh place), and FIBA Oceania Zone placed one team (runner-up).

The 12 teams were divided into four groups of three teams each and played a single round robin. The two best placed teams from each group qualified for the quarterfinals, semifinals, finals and consolation games which determined the first three places and thus the teams that qualified for the Olympics.

The twelve participating teams were: Brazil, Cameroon, Canada, Cape Verde, Croatia, Germany, Greece, Korea, Lebanon, New Zealand, Puerto Rico, and Slovenia.  The three teams that qualified through this tournament—Croatia, Germany and Greece—joined Angola, Argentina, Australia, China, Iran, Lithuania, Russia, Spain and the US in the Beijing Olympics, and had roughly a month to practice and prepare as the Olympic basketball tournament took place on August 9–24.

Participating nations 
The teams were divided into three pots, corresponding to their continental zones:

In case a team fails to attend, the next best team from their zone play as their replacements.

Squads

Format 
The teams were divided into four groups (Groups A-D) for the preliminary round.
Round robin for the preliminary round; the top two teams from each group advanced to the quarterfinals. The last-placed team in each group was eliminated.
A single-elimination tournament was then held; the quarterfinals pairings were:
A1 vs. B2
B1 vs. A2
C1 vs. D2
D1 vs. C2
The semifinal pairings were A1/B2 vs. C1/D2 and B1/A2 vs. D1/C2. The semifinal winners qualified for the Olympics. No championship game was held.
The semifinal losers played for the last Olympic qualifying berth.

Preliminary round

Group A

Group B

Group C

Group D

Knockout stage
Note: Italicized teams qualify for the Olympics.

Quarterfinals

Semi-finals

3rd place match

Final standings

References

External links
Official Site powered by FIBA

 
2008
Qual
2008 in basketball
2008–09 in Greek basketball
International basketball competitions hosted by Greece
Sports competitions in Athens